Roller Sport South Africa (RSSA) is the national sports governing body to promote, improve and develop the sport of roller skating (artistic and speed roller skating) in South Africa. Roller Sport South Africa is affiliated to the world governing body International Federation of Roller Sports known by its french acronym FIRS, the African Confederation of Sports of Roller Skating (ACSRS), and SASCOC. RSSA aims to become among the top 15 skating nations worldwide with a strong base of informed and competent coaches, officials and administrators.

See also
 Sport in South Africa

References

External links
 
 
Roller Sport South Africa on Team SA
 FIRS website

Sports governing bodies in South Africa
Roller skating organizations